Camarda is a surname. Notable people with the surname include:

Charles Camarda (born 1952), American engineer and astronaut
Demetrio Camarda (1821–1882), Albanian linguist
, Italian volleyball player

See also
 Camarda